Davide Rodari (born 23 June 1999) is a Swiss professional footballer who plays as a forward for Worthing, on loan from Crawley Town.

Early life
Rodari was born in Switzerland and is of Dutch and Italian descent. He grew up in Novara, Italy. After moving to England, he studied Level 2 Fitness Instructing at East Sussex College in Hastings.

Career
Rodari played youth football for Inter Milan, Novara and Pro Vercelli in Italy, and Lugano in Switzerland.

Rodari moved to England in 2016 to play youth football for Eastbourne Borough. He joined Hastings United in February 2017. He made his debut for Hastings on the opening day of the 2017–18 season in a 2–1 win over Corinthian-Casuals. In June 2018, Rodari signed a contract for the 2018–19 season with the option for a further year. He scored eight goals for Hastings United in a 12–3 Alan Turvey Trophy win over East Grinstead Town in November 2019. In April 2020, his contract was extended for the 2020–21 season.

On 25 January 2021, he signed for League Two club Crawley Town for an undisclosed fee on a two-and-a-half-year contract with the option for a further two years. He made his debut the following day as a substitute in a 2–1 FA Cup defeat away to AFC Bournemouth. He made 13 appearances for the club across the 2020–21 season, scoring once with Crawley's only goal of a 4–1 home defeat to Bolton Wanderers on the final day of the season.

On 10 February 2022, Rodari joined Isthmian League Premier Division side Worthing on loan for the remainder of the 2021–22 season. Having scored four goals in five games for the club however, Rodari was recalled and sent on loan to Dorking Wanderers to allow him to play at a higher level.

On 13 July 2022, Rodari joined Dartford on loan for an initial six–month period having impressed while on trial at the club during pre–season.

On 6 January 2023, Rodari left Dartford and immediately joined former-club Worthing on loan until the end of the 2022–23 season.

Career statistics

References

External links
 

Living people
1999 births
Swiss men's footballers
Italian footballers
Swiss people of Italian descent
Swiss people of Dutch descent
Italian people of Dutch descent
Association football forwards
Inter Milan players
Novara F.C. players
F.C. Pro Vercelli 1892 players
FC Lugano players
Eastbourne Borough F.C. players
Hastings United F.C. players
Crawley Town F.C. players
Worthing F.C. players
Dorking Wanderers F.C. players
Dartford F.C. players
English Football League players
National League (English football) players
Isthmian League players
Expatriate footballers in England